Events from the year 1973 in Austria.

Incumbents
 President – Franz Jonas
 Chancellor – Bruno Kreisky

Births
 25 March – Michaela Dorfmeister, alpine skier
 26 April – Stephanie Graf, athlete

Deaths
 29 September – W. H. Auden, British-American poet (born 1973 in England)

References

1973 in Austria